Zhakaas is a 2011 Marathi comedy feature film directed by Ankush Chaudhari. It stars Ankush Chaudhari, Amruta Khanvilkar, Sai Tamhankar and Pooja Sawant in lead roles.

Cast 
 Ankush Chaudhari
 Amruta Khanvilkar 
 Sai Tamhankar 
 Pooja Sawant 
 Jeetendra Joshi 
 Pushkar Shrotri 
 Atul Parchure 
 Sanjay Khapre 
 Vikas Samudre 
 Jaywant Wadkar

References 

2010s Marathi-language films